Fred Alexander defeated Alfred Dunlop 3–6, 3–6, 6–0, 6–2, 6–3 in the final to win the men's singles tennis title at the 1908 Australasian Championships.

Draw

Key
 Q = Qualifier
 WC = Wild card
 LL = Lucky loser
 r = Retired

References

External links
  Grand Slam Tennis Archive – Australasian Open 1908
 

1908 in Australian tennis
Men's Singles